Wartburgkreis is a Kreis (district) in the west of Thuringia, Germany. Neighboring districts are (from the north clockwise) the districts Unstrut-Hainich-Kreis, Gotha, Schmalkalden-Meiningen, and the districts Fulda, Hersfeld-Rotenburg and Werra-Meißner-Kreis in Hesse.

History
The district was created in 1994 by merging the previous districts Eisenach and Bad Salzungen, and a few municipalities from the district Bad Langensalza. The city Eisenach left the district in 1998 and became a district-free city and was incorporated into the district again on 1 July 2021. The municipality Kaltennordheim passed from the Wartburgkreis to Schmalkalden-Meiningen on 1 January 2019.

The district is named after the Wartburg, a castle near Eisenach most famous as the place of residence of Ludwig, Landgrave of Thuringia and his wife, Saint Elizabeth of Hungary; and, as Martin Luther's refuge in 1521.

Geography
The district is located in the Thuringian Forest, including the Hainich national park. The main river in the district is the Werra.

Coat of arms
The coat of arms combines the symbols of the historic states which existed on the territory. In the top left and the bottom right is the lion of the dukes of Thuringia, the fowl in the top right refers to the county Henneberg, and the black cross in the bottom left is the symbol of the imperial abbey and state of Fulda.

Towns and municipalities

{|
|-----
!Verwaltungsgemeinschaft-free towns!!colspan=2|and municipalities
|-
|valign=top|
Bad Salzungen
Bad Liebenstein
Eisenach
Geisa
Ruhla
Treffurt
Vacha
Werra-Suhl-Tal
|valign=top|
Barchfeld-Immelborn
Buttlar
Dermbach
Empfertshausen
Gerstengrund
Gerstungen
Hörselberg-Hainich
Krayenberggemeinde
|valign=top|
Leimbach
Oechsen
Schleid
Seebach
Unterbreizbach
Weilar
Wiesenthal
Wutha-Farnroda
|}

References

External links
Official website (German)

 
Districts of Thuringia